is a mountain range in southeastern Hokkaido, Japan. It runs  from Mount Sahoro or Karikachi Pass in central Hokkaidō south, running into the sea at Cape Erimo. The Hidaka Mountains separate the subprefectures of Hidaka and Tokachi. Most of the range lies in the Hidaka-sanmyaku Erimo Quasi-National Park (日高山脈襟裳国定公園, Hidaka-sanmyaku Erimo Kokutei-kōen). Since the mountain range lies so far north, the alpine climate zone lies at a lower altitude.

Geology
The Hidaka Mountains formed in the late Quaternary as part of the outer arc of the western end of the Kuril Island Arc. They were formed by the uplift resulting from the collision with the Kuril arc and the Northeast Japan Arc. The Hidaka mountains no longer appear to be uplifting.

The western end of the range is high P/T metamorphoseed Jurassic accretionary complex as part of the Kamuikotan belt. This is characterized by sedimentary rocks from the Cretaceous and Jurassic-Lower Cretaceous periods. The eastern end of the range is tertiary metamorphic rock as part of the Hidaka Metamorphic belt. This is characterized by low to medium pressure metamorphic rocks with sedimentary rocks from the Cretaceous-Lower Miocene. Plutonic rocks intrude into these structures. For the most part, the Hidaka mountains are composed of schists, migmatites, gneisses, and granites.

Glaciation
The Hidaka mountains are the only mountains in Hokkaido to show evidence of glaciation. This occurs above , where one can find moraines and more than 20 cirques from Mount Kitatottabetsu in the north to Mount Toyoni in the south.

Flora and fauna

The Hidaka Mountains are also one of the last refuges of the Hokkaido bear (Ursus arctos yesoensis) and Hokkaido deer (Cervus nippon yesoensis).

The mountains can be divided into four zones. The topmost zone (1,400–1,600 m) is colonized by Siberian dwarf pine and other alpine flora. From 1,200 to 1,300 m is occupied by Betula ermanii. The zone above 500 m is occupied by Picea jezoensis and Abies sachalinensis along with broad-leafed trees. The lowest zone below 500 m is occupied by broad-leafed trees, including Quercus mongolica, Acer pictum subsp. mono and Cercidiphyllum japonicum.

Resident bird species include hazel grouse, black woodpecker, great spotted woodpecker, white-backed woodpecker, goldcrest, Eurasian treecreeper, and spotted nutcracker. Summer visitors to the Hidaka Mountains include Japanese accentor, Siberian blue robin, Japanese robin, red-flanked bluetail, Siberian thrush, Eastern crowned warbler, narcissus flycatcher, blue-and-white flycatcher, dark-sided flycatcher, grey bunting, and Eurasian bullfinch. Notable bird species that transit the Hidaka mountains are Arctic warbler and eyebrowed thrush.

List of passes and tunnels
The major passes and tunnels through the Hidaka Mountains are as follows:
 Hidaka Pass
 Karikachi Pass
 Nisshō Pass and tunnel
 Nozuka pass and tunnel

List of peaks by height
Mountains of the Hidaka range in order of elevation:

Bibliography 
 Paul Hunt, Hiking in Japan: An Adventurer's Guide to the Mountain Trails, Tokyo, Kodansha International Ltd., 1988.  and  C0075
 Shyun Umezawa, Yasuhiko Sugawara, and Jun Nakagawa, Hokkaidō Natsuyama Gaido 4: Hidaka Sanmyaku no Yamayama (北海道夏山ガイド4日高山脈の山やま), Sapporo, The Hokkaido Shimbun Press, 1991.

References
 Northern Road Navi
 Hokkaipedia
 GLGarcs, H. Nishiwaki, Introduction to the landforms and geology of Japan, 2006, last access 25 April 2008.

External links
 Hidaka Mountain Museum 
 Google Maps

Mountain ranges of Hokkaido